George Donald Mancini (born January 25, 1963) is an American screenwriter and film director, most notable for the Child's Play franchise.

Career
Having been a horror fan since his childhood, Mancini's inspiration for Child's Play were films like Trilogy of Terror and the "Talky Tina" episode of The Twilight Zone, stating that he knew the killer doll trope, but realized it had never been done as a feature-length film in the age of animatronics. As a film student at UCLA in the mid-1980s, Mancini was amused by the hysteria surrounding the Cabbage Patch Kids, and that the ubiquitous dolls were disappearing from toy shelves and prompting physical fights between parents. Mancini's father had worked in the advertising industry all his life, and he knew how effective marketing could result in consumer bedlam. Based on this, Mancini wanted to write a dark satire about how marketing affected children, with his first effort being as the co-writer of Child's Play (1988).

Mancini wrote all seven films in the original Child's Play film series, and was the executive producer of Bride of Chucky and Cult of Chucky. He began directing Child's Play franchise entries with Seed of Chucky (2004), followed by Curse of Chucky (2013) and Cult (2017), and was the creator, writer, and director of the Chucky TV series. He was not involved with the 2019 reboot.

In 2007, he won the EyeGore award for career contributions to the horror genre. He sometimes goes by the pseudonym Kit Dubois. Mancini attended St. Christopher's School in Richmond, Virginia, University of California in Los Angeles, and Columbia University (Brad Dourif was among his teachers) in New York City.

Filmography

Film

Television

Awards

References

External links
 
 Campblood.org Interview with Don Mancini 

1963 births
American people of Italian descent
American film producers
American male screenwriters
American writers of Italian descent
Columbia University alumni
English-language film directors
Film directors from Virginia
American gay writers
Horror film directors
LGBT film directors
LGBT people from Virginia
Living people
Screenwriters from Virginia
St. Christopher's School (Richmond, Virginia) alumni
University of California, Los Angeles alumni
Writers from Richmond, Virginia
American LGBT screenwriters
21st-century LGBT people